The 1974 Colorado State Rams football team represented Colorado State University in the Western Athletic Conference during the 1974 NCAA Division I football season. In their second season under head coach Sark Arslanian, the Rams compiled a 4–6–1 record.

Schedule

References

Colorado State
Colorado State Rams football seasons
Colorado State Rams football